The 102nd Division() (2nd Formation) of the People's Liberation Army in China was organized on October 11, 1950 from the 9th Security Brigade of Huadong Military Region. The division was composed of 3 infantry regiments, 304th Infantry Regiment, 305th Infantry Regiment, 306th Infantry Regiment. In May 1952 the division was reorganized as the 4th Agricultural Construction Division and In November 1955 the division was disbanded.

References

建国后中国人民解放军步兵师的发展, http://club.xilu.com/zgjsyj/msgview-819697-74513.html

102
Military units and formations disestablished in 1955
Military units and formations established in 1950
1955 disestablishments in China
1950 establishments in China